Denden is an Eritrean football club based in Asmara.

Current squad

See also
Football in Eritrea

References

Football clubs in Eritrea